The 2012–13 Morehead State Eagles men's basketball team represented Morehead State University during the 2012–13 NCAA Division I men's basketball season. The Eagles, led by first year head coach Sean Woods, played their home games at Ellis Johnson Arena and were members of the East Division of the Ohio Valley Conference. They finished the season 15–18, 8–8 in OVC play to finish in a tie for fourth place in the East Division. They lost in the quarterfinals of the Ohio Valley Conference tournament to Tennessee State.

Roster

Schedule

|-
!colspan=9| Exhibition

|-
!colspan=9| Regular season

|-
!colspan=9| 2013 OVC Basketball tournament

References

Morehead State Eagles men's basketball seasons
Morehead State
Morehead State Eagles men's basketball
Morehead State Eagles men's basketball